Elisha Helm Calvert (born William Helm; June 27, 1863 – October 5, 1941) was an American film actor and director. He appeared in more than 170 films, as well as directing a further 60 titles.

Biography
He was born William Helm in Madison, Wisconsin, (or in Alexandria, Virginia), and died in Hollywood, California. He was a Spanish–American War veteran who served in Cuba. He was a member of the Adventurers Club of New York.

Calvert was raised in Madison and graduated from Central High School. He acted for a summer at the Fuller Opera House. After a military career from which he retired as a captain, he acted in stock theater, including working in Arizona, where he acted with Theodore Roberts. He also performed in vaudeville. For 18 years, he was a director, beginning with the Essanay Company. He also acted in films for Essanay.

Calvert had a son, also named William Helm.

Selected filmography

 The Snare (1912)
 One Wonderful Night (1914, director) - Chief Detective Steingall
 The Showman (1914)
 The Slim Princess (1915, director)
 The Crimson Wing (1915) - Count Ludwig von Leun-Walram
 A Daughter of the City (1915) - Henry L. Bancroft
 Vultures of Society (1916) - Raymond Raphael
 According to the Code (1916) - Judge Andrews
 The Wide, Wrong Way (Essanay1917, director)
 Branded (1920, director)
 Affinities (1922)
 Silent Evidence (1922, director)
 The Silent Partner (1923) - Jim Harker
 Why Men Leave Home (1924) - Arthur Phillips
 Bluff (1924) - Norbert Conroy
 The Only Woman (1924) - Rodney Blake
 Inez from Hollywood (1924) - Gardner
 East of Suez (1925) - Sidney Forbes
 Sally (1925) - Richard Farquar
 The Talker (1925) - Mr. Grayson
 Havoc (1925) - Regimental Adjutant
 The Girl from Montmartre (1926) - Lord Robert Hautrive
 Ella Cinders (1926) - Studio Actor (uncredited)
 The House Without a Key (1926, Serial) - Dan Winterclip
 Melting Millions (1927)
 Rookies (1927) - Colonel
 The First Auto (1927) - Elmer Hays (uncredited)
 Lonesome Ladies (1927) - Mr. Burton
 The Wizard (1927) - Edwin Palmer
 West Point (1927) - Superintendent (uncredited)
 The Man Without a Face (1928, Serial)
 Let 'Er Go Gallegher (1928) - City Editor
 The Legion of the Condemned (1928) - Commandant
 Why Sailors Go Wrong (1928) - Cyrus Green
 4 Devils (1928)
 Moran of the Marines (1928) - Gen. Marshall
 Prep and Pep (1928) - Col. Marsh
 The City of Youth (1928, director)
 The Canary Murder Case (1929) - Dist. Atty. John F.X. Markham
 Blue Skies (1929) - Mr. Semple Jones (episode 1)
 The Studio Murder Mystery (1929) - Grant (uncredited)
 Thunderbolt (1929) - Dist. Atty. McKay
 Dark Streets (1929) - Police Lieutenant
 The Greene Murder Case (1929) - Dist. Atty. John F.X. Markham
 Fast Company (1929) - Platt
 Illusion (1929) - Doctor (uncredited)
 The Virginian (1929) - Judge Henry
 The Mighty (1929) - Major General
 The Love Parade (1929) - Sylvanian Ambassador
 Darkened Rooms (1929) - Mr. Clayton (uncredited)
 Peacock Alley (1930) - Paul
 The Kibitzer (1930) - Westcott
 Behind the Make-Up (1930) - Dawson
 Only the Brave (1930) - The Colonel
 Men Are Like That (1930) - Superintendent (uncredited)
 The Benson Murder Case (1930) - Dist. Atty. John F.X. Markham
 Ladies Love Brutes (1930) - Committeeman (uncredited)
 The Social Lion (1930) - Henderson
 The Border Legion (1930) - Judge Savin
 A Man from Wyoming (1930) - Maj. Gen. Hunter
 Let's Go Native (1930) - Diner (uncredited)
 Half Shot at Sunrise (1930) - Gen. Hale (uncredited)
 The Widow from Chicago (1930) - Police Captain R.L. Davis
 Beyond Victory (1931) - Commanding Officer (uncredited)
 Graft (1931) - Police Inspector (uncredited)
 Horse Feathers (1932) - Professor in Wagstaff's office (uncredited)
 The Conquerors (1932) - Doctor
 Wild Horse Mesa (1932) - Sheriff
 The Mysterious Rider (1933) - Sheriff Matt Arnold
 The Power and the Glory (1933) - Board of Directors (uncredited)
 Duck Soup (1933) - Officer in Battle Sequence (uncredited)
 The House of Rothschild (1934) - Lord Chamberlain (uncredited)
 Here Comes the Groom (1934) - George Randolph
 One Exciting Adventure (1934) - Casino Door Man (uncredited)
 The Mighty Barnum (1934) - House Detective (uncredited)
 Rumba (1935) - Police Captain (uncredited)
 So Red the Rose (1935) - Cavalry Major (uncredited)
 Death from a Distance (1935) - District Attorney
 Western Courage (1935) - Colonel Austin
 The Oregon Trail (1936) - Jim Ridgeley
 Murder at Glen Athol (1936) - District Attorney McDougal
 The Glory Trail (1936) - Colonel Strong
 Ellis Island (1936) - Commissioner H.L. Carson (uncredited)
 Union Pacific (1939) - Major (uncredited) (final film role)

References

External links

1863 births
1941 deaths
American male film actors
Male actors from Alexandria, Virginia
Film directors from Virginia
20th-century American male actors
American military personnel of the Spanish–American War
Vaudeville performers